The 2021 Africa Beach Soccer Cup of Nations was the fourth edition of the Africa Beach Soccer Cup of Nations (BSAFCON), the premier beach soccer championship in Africa contested by men's national teams who are members of the Confederation of African Football (CAF). Originally organised by Beach Soccer Worldwide (BSWW) under the title FIFA Beach Soccer World Cup CAF qualifier (informally known as CAF Beach Soccer Championship), in 2015, CAF became organisers and began using the BSAFCON title to which the competition was officially renamed the next year. Overall, this was the 10th edition of the event.

The tournament was due to take place in Jinja, Uganda between 23 and 29 November 2020. However, due to the COVID-19 pandemic and rising water levels on the shores of Lake Victoria affecting the host beach, Uganda withdrew from hosting. Senegal were subsequently chosen as the new hosts, with the tournament rescheduled to take place from 23 to 29 May 2021, in the city of Saly.

The event also acted as the qualification route for African teams to the 2021 FIFA Beach Soccer World Cup in Russia; the winners and runners-up qualified.

Senegal were the defending champions and successfully defended the title, after defeating Mozambique 4–1 in the final to secure their 6th title.

Qualification

The 2021 Africa Beach Soccer Cup of Nations qualifying round determined the eight teams that would compete in the final tournament in May 2021.

The fixtures were announced by CAF on 4 March 2021. The matches were to be played on the weekends of 26–27 March and 9–10 April 2021. However, the COVID-19 pandemic caused a number of withdrawals. 

Qualification ties were played on a home-and-away, two-legged basis. If the sides were level on aggregate after the second leg, the away goals rule was applied, and if still level, the tie proceeded directly to a penalty shoot-out (no extra time played).

Entrants
Fourteen teams entered the competition. The qualifying matches involved the lowest-ranked twelve entrants. The six winners of the ties qualified for the final tournament, joining two automatic qualifiers – Senegal, the hosts, and Egypt, the highest-ranked entrant based on the results of the previous edition. 

Nigeria, who had previously competed at every edition of the tournament and qualified for the World Cup from the last two championships, were unable to enter this year's tournament because the Nigeria Football Federation (NFF) had indefinitely barred the national team from competing following the team's "poor outing" at the 2019 World Cup.

Note: The numbers in parentheses show the African ranking of the teams at the time of the qualification round (out of 23 nations).

Matches

|}

Qualified teams
The following eight teams qualified for the final tournament:

Draw
The draw to split the eight teams into two groups of four took place at 12:00 EGY (UTC+2) on 29 April 2021 in Cairo, Egypt. It was conducted by CAF Head of Competitions, Khaled Nasser.

Initially, two teams were seeded and assigned to the head of the groups: to Group A, as the hosts, Senegal, and to Group B, as team ranked highest in the previous edition of the championship, Egypt. The other six teams were placed in a single pot. As each was drawn out, the placement of the teams alternated back and forth between Groups A and B.

Venue

One venue was used to host all matches in the city of Saly. The stadium was purpose-built; it was scheduled to be constructed between 11 and 17 May. It had a capacity of 1000, however, 500 was the maximum capacity in order to accommodate social distancing measures regarding the COVID-19 pandemic.

Squads

Each squad contained up to 15 players.

Group stage
The match schedule was originally released on 8 May. The programme was revised on 20 May.

Each team earns three points for a win in regulation time, two points for a win in extra time, one point for a win in a penalty shoot-out, and no points for a defeat. The top two teams from each group advance to the semi-finals.

All times are local, GMT (UTC±0).

Group A

Group B

5th place play-off
The teams finishing in third place in the groups are knocked out of title-winning contention, receding to play in a consolation match to determine 5th and 6th place in the final standings.

Knockout stage
The group winners and runners-up progress to the knockout stage to continue to compete for the title. 27 May was allocated as a rest day.

Semi finals
Winners qualify for the 2021 FIFA Beach Soccer World Cup.

Third place play-off

Final

Awards

Winners trophy

Individual awards
The following awards were given at the conclusion of the tournament:

Goalscorers

Final standings

Qualified teams for FIFA Beach Soccer World Cup
The following two teams from CAF qualify for the 2021 FIFA Beach Soccer World Cup.

1 Bold indicates champions for that year. Italic indicates hosts for that year.

References

External links
Beach Soccer Africa Cup of Nations, at CAFonline.com
CAF Beach Soccer Africa Cup of Nations Senegal , at Beach Soccer Worldwide

Beach Soccer Championship
Caf
International association football competitions hosted by Senegal
2021
2021 in beach soccer
Beach Soccer Cup of Nations